Ali Akbar Saremi (Persian:علی‌اکبر صارمی)  (1943 – 2017) was an architect from Iran. Saremi earned a Masters in Architecture from the Faculty of Fine Arts, University of Tehran, in 1968. He got his doctorate in architecture under the supervision of Louis Kahn from the University of Pennsylvania, in 1976.

Philosophy
Saremi is a well-known figure in contemporary architecture, for construction projects involving limited urban spaces. In an interview with Taghi Radmard (Bahram Hooshyar Yousefi) he stated: "We designed the building in this way that solve the issue of neighborhood (in case of a school for girls). Moreover, school became a happy space and a happy space needs happy and bright materials. Some colors, trees, light shadows have to hide, space for children to hide... Spaces do not have to be defined, only." He also spoke about Persian architecture.

Career
After returning to Iran, Sarmi worked in the architecture office of Sardar Afkhami and in 1968 he founded his own office, Tajeer Consulting Engineers. He was Chairman of Tajeer Engineers.

Saremi was a lecturer at Farabi University (now known as the Isfahan University of Art) from 1976 to 1980. He was a lecturer at Islamic Azad University from 1994 to 1997, In addition to teaching at the University of Tehran, he has also published articles in prestigious architecture magazines.

Projects
 Sarmi Villa, Nowshahr, 1973
 Afshar House, Zafaranieh, Tehran, 1974-1976
 Academy of Fine Arts, Karaj 1995
The building of the Embassy of the Islamic Republic of Iran in Algeria, 2008
The building of the Embassy of the Islamic Republic of Iran in Tirana, Albania, 2002-2004
Kermanshah City Hall (Waiting Hall), 2004-2008
Amphitheater of Pasteur Institute, Tehran, Tajir, 1988
Embassy of the Islamic Republic of Iran in Albania, Tajir 2000
Bloor Tower commercial building, Tabriz, Tajir 2001
Commercial and cultural complex and city council, Mashhad, Tajir 2003
Exhibition and office complex, Kish, Tajir 2004

References

1943 births
2017 deaths
Iranian architects
University of Tehran alumni
University of Pennsylvania School of Design alumni
Academic staff of the Islamic Azad University, Central Tehran Branch